Frank P. "Bud" Van Deren (November 22, 1924 – September 9, 2010) was an American football player and coach.  He served as the head football coach at Humboldt State University from 1966 to 1985, compiling a record of 98–101–4.  Van Deren died on September 9, 2010, in Eureka, California.

Head coaching record

College football

References

External links
 

1924 births
2010 deaths
American football ends
Basketball coaches from California
California Golden Bears football coaches
California Golden Bears football players
Humboldt State Lumberjacks football coaches
Santa Rosa Bear Cubs football players
Sportspeople from Alameda County, California
College track and field coaches in the United States
College wrestling coaches in the United States
High school football coaches in California
Junior college football coaches in the United States
Junior college men's basketball coaches in the United States
United States Navy personnel of World War II
United States Navy sailors
Sportspeople from Boston
People from San Leandro, California
Players of American football from California
Players of American football from Boston